Cabernet Dorsa is a dark-skinned variety of grape used for red wine. It was created at a grape breeding institute in Weinsberg in the Württemberg wine region of Germany in 1971 by crossing the Blaufränkisch and Dornfelder varieties. The original information from the breeders Helmut Schleip and Bernd HE Hill, that it was a cross between Dornfelder and Cabernet Sauvignon, has since been refuted by DNA analysis, according to Foundation Plant Services at the University of California at Davis. Cabernet Dorsa received varietal protection and was released for general cultivation in 2003. The vines of Cabernet Dorsa show good winter hardiness and the grapes reach higher must weights than Dornfelder or Spätburgunder under typical German growing conditions.

In 2000, before the variety's general release, there existed only  of experimental plantations.

Cabernet Dorsa wines are deep in colour, rich in tannin, have noticeable aromas of cherry and bell peppers and are considered well suited for oak barrel aging. 

It is known under the synonyms (breeding codes) We 71-817-92 with We denoting Weinsberg.

The German language version of Wikipedia offers a more complete description.

References

Red wine grape varieties